Cecidothyris pexa is a species of moth of the family Thyrididae. It is found in South Africa and Tanzania.

The wingspan of this species is 25–34 mm.

Subspecies
Cecidothyris pexa pexa   (Hampson, 1906)
Cecidothyris pexa guttulata   (Aurivillius, 1910)

References

Thyrididae
Lepidoptera of Mozambique
Lepidoptera of Tanzania
Lepidoptera of South Africa
Moths of Sub-Saharan Africa
Moths described in 1906